is a book written by the Japanese author Junichiro Tanizaki. It uses an informal essay style to look back on his early life in Tokyo. It was originally published in serial form in the literary magazine Bungeishunjū between April 1955 and March 1956. The book was translated into English by Paul McCarthy.

References

1957 non-fiction books
Books by Junichiro Tanizaki
Literature first published in serial form
Japanese memoirs